is a Japanese professional baseball outfielder for the Hanshin Tigers in Japan's Nippon Professional Baseball.

Early baseball career

Keisuke was born in Shibukawa, Gunma, Japan, and originally played as pitcher in junior high, but upon his election as team captain, he also became the team's catcher. During his 3rd year in Maebashi Kogyo High School, his team competed with Kiryuu Daiichi High in the Gunma prefectural tournament, wherein despite cracking a 4-run homer from Yasuhiro Ichiba (now with the Swallows), they were defeated. Despite this, he was the Hanshin Tiger's 3rd pick in the 2000 draft.

Due to his mature appearance in high school, he was dubbed as "Kakefu of Joshu" (Joshu no Kakefu or 上州の掛布), in reference to former Tigers player Masayuki Kakefu.

References

External links

NPB stats

1982 births
Living people
Baseball people from Gunma Prefecture
Japanese baseball players
Nippon Professional Baseball outfielders
Hanshin Tigers players
People from Shibukawa, Gunma